In the field of perception, a scene is information that can flow from a physical environment into a perceptual system via sensory transduction.

A perceptual system is designed to interpret scenes.

Examples of scenes include
 Still images
 Binocular still images
 Moving images (movies)
 Binocular moving images (~3D movies)
 Sounds of a local environment (audio recordings)
 Tactile properties of a local environment.

A natural scene is a scene that a perceptual system would typically encounter in a natural mode of operation. Therefore, a very relevant area of research is natural scene statistics.

References 

Perception